László Bita (born 14 August 1967) is a Hungarian football player who currently plays for Paksi SE.

Honours
Hungarian League:  Winner: 2000 
UEFA Champions League:   Third qualifying round: 2000/01 
UEFA Cup:  First round: 2000/01

References
http://www.hlsz.hu/index.php?WG_NODE=WebHlszJatekos&WG_OID=hPLf_835f0e8

1967 births
Living people
Hungarian footballers
Association football goalkeepers
Dunaújváros FC players
Szeged LC footballers
Paksi FC players